SWF Seeks Same (1990) (later retitled Single White Female) is a thriller novel by John Lutz.  The story concerns a woman whose new roommate seems perfect, until the roommate starts copying her and behaving strangely in other ways. The new roommate begins duplicating every life style and behavior of the girl she is renting from.

The novel was the basis for the film Single White Female in 1992.

The novel was re-released as an e-book in September 2011.

References

1990 American novels
American thriller novels
American novels adapted into films